Narciso Ibáñez Menta (August 25, 1912 – May 15, 2004) was a Spanish theatre, film, and television actor.

Biography
Born in Langreo, Asturias, Spain, Ibáñez Menta made his first stage appearance at the age of seven at the Teatro La Comedia of Buenos Aires. He worked in both theatre and film in Argentina until 1964, when he returned to Spain and developed a successful television career. In both Argentina and Spain, he was particularly prominent in suspense and horror subjects.

He married the Argentine actress Pepita Serrador, a member of a theatre family. In 1935 they had a son, Narciso Ibáñez Serrador, who became a director, writer and actor, and directed the Spanish television series Historias para no dormir (1973), El Televisor (1974) and El fin empezó ayer (1982) in which his father starred.

Films featuring Ibáñez Menta included Historia de crímenes (1942), La Bestia debe morir (1952), Tres citas con el destino (1953), Obras maestras del terror (1960), Shoot Twice (1969), La saga de los Drácula (1972), Los muchachos de antes no usaban arsénico (1976), Viaje al más allá (1980), Sal gorda (1983), and Más allá de la muerte (1984).

His last film role was in ¡Qué vecinos tan animales! (1998).

His health gradually deteriorated, to the point that in 1996 he was implanted with a pacemaker and spent the last few years prostrate in bed. He died on May 15, 2004 at the Hospital de Madrid when he was 91 years old.

His body was cremated in the Cemetery of La Almudena in Madrid on May 16, 2004.

In 2008, Argentine cinema director Gustavo Leonel Mendoza exhibited a documentary about Ibañez Menta's life, titled Nadie inquietó más ('Nobody disturbed more'). In 2010, Argentine writers Leandro D'Ambrosio and  Marcelo Rodríguez aka "Gillespi" published a biography of the actor, El artesano del miedo ['The Craftsman of Fear'].

Filmography

Films 

A Light in the Window (1942) 
Historia de crímenes (1942)
Cuando en el cielo pasen lista (1945)
El que recibe las bofetadas (1947)
Corazón (1947)
Vidalita (1949)
Almafuerte (1949)
La muerte está mintiendo (1950)
Derecho viejo (1951)
La calle junto a la luna (1951)
La bestia debe morir (1952)
Fin de mes (1953)
Un hombre cualquiera (1954)
Tres citas con el destino (1954)
Cinco gallinas y el cielo (1957)
Procesado 1040 (1958)
Obras Maestras del Terror (1960)
La cigarra no es un bicho (1964)
Pasto de fieras (1967)
Due volte Giuda (1969)
Aventura en Hong Kong (1969)
La saga de los Dracula (1973)
Odio mi cuerpo (1974)
Los muchachos de antes no usaban arsénico (1976)
Lucecita (1976)
Sabado, chica, motel, que lio aquel (1976)
Tres dias de noviembre (1977)
Préstamela esta noche (1978)
Viaje al más allá (1980)
Yo hice a Roque III 1980
El retorno del hombre lobo (1981)
Los líos de Estefanía (1982)
El ser (1982)
Sal gorda (1984)
Más allá de la muerte (1986)
Sólo se muere dos veces (1997)
¡Qué vecinos tan animales! (1998)

Television 
Los premios nobel (1958)
Obras maestras del terror (1960)
El fantasma de la ópera (1960)
Arsenio Lupin (1961)
¿Es usted el asesino? (Argentinian version) (1961)
La pata de mono (1961)
El muñeco maldito (1962)
Mañana puede ser verdad (Argentinian version) (1962)
El sátiro (1963)
Estudio 3 (1964)
La Historia de San Michel (1964)
Mañana puede ser verdad (Spanish version) (1964)
Historias para no dormir (1965–1982)
Historia de la frivolidad (1967)
¿Es usted el asesino? (1967)
El hombre que volvió de la muerte (1969)
Un pacto con los brujos (1969)
El premio (1969)
Estudio 1 (1969-1980)
Robot (1970)
El Monstruo no ha muerto (1970)
Otra vez Dracula (1970)
Alta comedia (1970–1972)
Mañana puedo morir (1979)
El pulpo negro (1985)

References

External links

 Archivo Ibáñez Menta 

1912 births
2004 deaths
People from Langreo
Expatriate male actors in Argentina
Spanish male stage actors
Spanish male film actors
Spanish male television actors
Spanish expatriates in Argentina